Ranomafana may refer to:
 Ranomafana Est - a village in Atsinanana, Madagascar
 Ranomafana, Ifanadiana, a town in Ifanadiana district, Madagascar
 Ranomafana, Taolanaro, a town in Taolanaro district, Madagascar
 Ranomafana National Park, Madagascar
 Ranomafana (beetle), a genus of beetles in the family Pyrochroidae